Billy Radloff is a South African international lawn bowler.

Radloff won the bronze medal in the fours with Clinton Roets and Brian Dixon and Wayne Perry at the 2008 World Outdoor Bowls Championship in Christchurch.

In 2007 he won the fours gold medal at the Atlantic Bowls Championships and in 2019 he won the triples gold medal at the Atlantic Bowls Championships

References

South African male bowls players
Living people
Year of birth missing (living people)